Surgeons (Chinese: 外科风云) is a 2017 Chinese television series produced by Hou Hongliang, directed by Li Xue and written by Zhu Zhu; starring Jin Dong and Bai Baihe. The series aired from 17 April to 10 May 2017 on Beijing TV and Zhejiang TV.

Synopsis
The story originates from a medical malpractice many years ago that resulted in the death of a car accident victim; who has been successfully resuscitated but later died of drug allergy. Zhang Shumei, the nurse who was on duty that night, was forced to resign after being suspected of accidentally killing the patient. Her seven-year-old son, Zhuang Shu did not believe the accusation, and got into a fight at the hospital, causing him to be held up at the police station. Unable to pick up his four-year-old sister, Zhuang Shu later finds out that she was abducted while he was away. Traumatized by the false accusation and the abduction of her daughter, Zhang Shumei eventually committed suicide.

28 years later, Zhuang Shu returns to the hospital as a surgeon; intent on unraveling the secret behind his family's misfortune while searching for his long-lost sister. He meets Lu Chenxi, a thoracic surgeon who is the daughter of the patient that died under Zhang Shumei’s care 30 years ago. Together, they investigate the mystery and fall in love in the process.

Cast

Main 
Jin Dong as Zhuang Shu
Bai Baihe as Lu Chenxi
Li Jiahang as Chen Shaocong
Liu Yijun  as Yang Fan

Supporting 
Lan Yingying as Yang Yu
He Dujuan as Chu Jun
Ma Shaoye as Fu Bowen 
Yang Xinming as Zong Xibei
Wang Sen as Yang Zixuan 
Jin Zehao as Fang Zhiwei 
Chin Shih-chieh as Xiu Minqi
Gao Lu as Lin Huan
Wu Xiaoyu
Chen Muyang
Wang Yongquan as Lu Chenxi's father
Juan Zi as Zhao Jing
Ding Yongdai 
Wu Nan 
Zhong Ziyi as Nurse
Chang Fangyuan
Zhang Moxi
Gao Xin

Special appearances
Hummer Zhang
Geng Le as Xue Luan, Lu Chenxi's ex-boyfriend
Hu Ge

Soundtrack

Reception

Ratings 

 Highest ratings are marked in red, lowest ratings are marked in blue

Awards and nominations

References

External links

Chinese medical television series
2017 Chinese television series debuts
Beijing Television original programming
Zhejiang Television original programming
Television series by Daylight Entertainment